The Military installations in Karachi are extensive as the Pakistani military has several military bases for all branches of its uniform services. The Pakistan Army has six military bases, that are noted as Cantts, while the Karachi Port serves as the main naval base for the Pakistan Navy and Qasim Fort as the headquarter for the Pakistan Marines. The Pakistan Air Force has three air force bases in Karachi.

Pakistan Army installations in Karachi
The V Corps, also known as Victory Corps, is an administrative corps of Pakistan Army assigned in Karachi, Sindh province of Pakistan. The V Corps is the only corps that is stationed in the Sindh Province, while the II Strike Corps and the IV Corps are both stationed in Punjab Province. It is headquartered in Karachi, and currently commanded by Lieutenant-General Naveed Mukhtar.

Cantonments in Karachi
 Army Base Clifton
 Faisal Cantonment
 Karachi Cantonment
 Korangi Creek Cantonment
 Malir Cantonment
 Manora Cantonment

Pakistan Navy installations in Karachi

Naval Academy
PNS Karsaz
PNS Rahat
PNS Shifa
PNS Abdoze
Fleet Acoustic Research and Classification Center

Naval Bases
 Naval Base Karachi
 PNS Iqbal
 PNS Himalaya

Naval Air Stations
 PNS Mehran
 PNS Himalaya

Coast Guard and Maritime Security Agency

Karachi Port Trust Building

Pakistan Marine Installations in Karachi
 Marine Base Qasim
 Marine Headquarters Qasim Fort

Pakistan Air Force installations in Karachi

Non-flying Air Force Base
 Malir Air Force Base
 Korangi-Creek Air Force Base

Air Force Bases in Karachi
 Faisal Air Force Base
 Masroor Air Force Base

See also
List of Pakistan Air Force Bases
List of forts in Pakistan

References